Graham Lloyd Hart (6 January 1906 – 18 April 1974) was an Australian politician and judge of the Supreme Court of Queensland He was the Liberal member for Mount Gravatt in the Legislative Assembly of Queensland from 1957 to 1963.

References

1906 births
1974 deaths
Liberal Party of Australia members of the Parliament of Queensland
Members of the Queensland Legislative Assembly
Judges of the Supreme Court of Queensland
Place of birth missing
20th-century Australian politicians